The Mjøllkvaevane Cirques are a series of small snow-filled cirques that indent the east side of Kvaevefjellet Mountain in the Payer Mountains of Queen Maud Land, Antarctica. They were plotted from air photos and surveys by the Sixth Norwegian Antarctic Expedition, 1956–60.

References

External links

Cirques of Queen Maud Land
Princess Astrid Coast